HD 10550 is a single star in the equatorial constellation of Cetus. It is a faint star but visible to the naked eye with an apparent visual magnitude of 4.98. The star is moving closer with a heliocentric radial velocity of −33 km/s.

At the estimated distance of this star, this yields a physical size of about 77 times the radius of the Sun. The star is radiating around 2,537 times the Sun's luminosity from its enlarged photosphere at an effective temperature of 4,110 K.

References

K-type giants
Runaway stars
Ceti, 170
Cetus (constellation)
Durchmusterung objects
010550
007999
0500